Bradley's Toy Money Complete with Game Of Banking was produced by the Milton Bradley Company.

Box
The writing of "Bradley’s Toy Money Complete with Game of Banking Milton Bradley Co. Springfield, Massachusetts U.S.A." is silver and stamped into red colored cardboard.

Inside the cover
4450 The Banking Game. 
Implements: one set of pay and collect cards.  This game is for 2-6 players.  One is appointed Banker, and the others are Businessmen.  The players take turns being Bankers.  TO PLAY: The Banker gives each Businessmen $10.00, and takes $10.00 themself.  He then places all the cards face down on the table, and the players (including the Banker) alternate in drawing them. Each player follows the instructions printed on the card, going to the box, and counting the money themselves. The first person to have $25.00 wins the game. If the Banker wins the game, they remain Banker for the next game.

Bills 
The dollar bills are one, two, five, ten, and twenty. They say "educational play money, Milton Bradley, Springfield Mass", with the dollar denomination written out and as a numeral and not negotiable. One side is mostly green with white and the other side is mostly white with green.

Coins
The coins are in one, five, ten, twenty-five, and fifty pieces. One side has the picture of a president with his name circling the coin. It also says "Bradley Educational Toy Money" circling underneath. The other side of the coin has the denomination written out as a numeral and as a word.  The coins are made out of cardboard with foil material pressed and glued onto them.

 1 = Alexander Hamilton
 5 = Theodore Roosevelt
 10 = Thomas Jefferson
 25 = George Washington
 50 = Abraham Lincoln

Bill Folds
Two bill-folds came with the game and are black that have bill fold written in gold with 2 lines above and below.

Collect From Bank
Collect From Bank have various amounts. Could have profit on bond, interest, legacy, bonus, trust fund, profit on stocks, tax club, withdrawals, profit on property, wages, dividends, Christmas fund, vacation club or insurance income.

Pay to Bank
Pay to Bank also have various amounts. Could have poll tax, rent, income tax, repairs to car, interest on car, payment on car, excise tax, repairs to house, interest on mortgage, poll tax or service charge.

Economic simulation board games
Milton Bradley Company games